The Grammy Award for Best Salsa Album was awarded from 2000 to 2003. In its first year the award was titled Best Salsa Performance.  In 2004 this award was combined with the award for Best Merengue Album as the Grammy Award for Best Salsa/Merengue Album.

Years reflect the year in which the Grammy Awards were presented, for works released in the previous year.

Recipients

See also

Grammy Award for Best Merengue Album
Grammy Award for Best Salsa/Merengue Album
Grammy Award for Best Tropical Latin Album
Latin Grammy Award for Best Salsa Album

Salsa Album
Salsa music
Awards established in 2000
Awards disestablished in 2003
Album awards